WBRG (1050 kHz) is a commercial AM radio station licensed to Lynchburg, Virginia.  It airs a talk radio format.  It is owned and operated by Brent Epperson with the license held by Tri-County Broadcasting, Inc.  It is a sister station of another Lynchburg talk outlet, 580 and 94.1 WLVA.

By day, WBRG is powered at 3,800 watts non-directional.  But 1050 AM is a Mexican clear channel frequency reserved for Class A XEG Monterrey.  So WBRG must greatly reduce power to 90 watts at night to avoid interference.  The transmitter is on Old Ragland Road at Wright Shop Road in Madison Heights, Virginia.  Programming is also heard on two FM translators at 104.5 MHz and 105.1 MHz in Lynchburg.

Programming
Most shows heard on WBRG are syndicated.  Weekday mornings begin with a Virginia-based morning show hosted by John Fredericks.  He's followed by Chris Plante, Dana Loesch, Bill O'Reilly, Mike Gallagher, James Dobson and Brandon Tatum.  On weekends, car races are heard from the Performance Racing Network.

History
The station was originally a daytimer, powered at 1,000 watts and required to go off the air at sunset. It has always been owned by someone in the Epperson Family. The founder and first general manager was Harry A. Epperson, Sr.

Translators
In addition to the main station, WBRG is relayed by two FM translators to widen its broadcast area.

References

External links
 Super Talk WBRG Online

1956 establishments in Virginia
News and talk radio stations in the United States
Sports radio stations in the United States
Radio stations established in 1956
BRG